The 1974 Barcelona WCT was a men's tennis tournament played on indoor carpet courts in Barcelona, Spain. The tournament was part of Green Group of the 1974 World Championship Tennis circuit. It was the second edition of the event and was held from 25 February through 3 March 1974. First-seeded Arthur Ashe won the singles title.

Finals

Singles

 Arthur Ashe defeated  Björn Borg 6–4, 3–6, 6–3

Doubles

 Arthur Ashe /  Roscoe Tanner defeated  Tom Edlefsen /  Tom Leonard 6–3, 6–4

See also
1974 Torneo Godó

References

Barcelona WCT
1974 World Championship Tennis circuit
Barcelona WCT